Adam Lawton (born 13 June 1993) is an English professional rugby league footballer who plays for the Widnes Vikings in the Betfred Championship, as a  or .

He played for the Widnes Vikings in the Super League, and on loan from Widnes at the North Wales Crusaders in the Championship. Lawton has spent time on loan from Salford at the Rochdale Hornets and the Swinton Lions in the Betfred Championship.

Background
Lawton was born in Widnes, Cheshire, England.

Career

Widnes Vikings
Lawton made his début in 2013, and scored nine tries in 12 appearances during his first season with the club. In July 2014, Lawton was granted a sabbatical from his contract with Widnes in order to "take an extended break to Australia".

Widnes Vikings (rejoined)
On 27 December 2020 it was reported that Lawton would re-join Widnes Vikings for the 2021 season on a 1-year deal.

References

External links
Salford Red Devils profile
SL profile

1993 births
Living people
English rugby league players
Newcastle Thunder players
North Wales Crusaders players
Rochdale Hornets players
Rugby league players from Widnes
Rugby league second-rows
Rugby league props
Salford Red Devils players
Swinton Lions players
Widnes Vikings players